Abercrombie   is a community in the Canadian province of Nova Scotia, located in  Pictou County. The village is named after Col James Abercrombie of the 42nd Regiment of Foot who was killed in the Battle of Bunker Hill.

References

Abercrombie on Destination Nova Scotia

Communities in Pictou County